Broxburn is a town in West Lothian, Scotland.

Broxburn may also refer to:

 Broxburn, Alberta, Canada
 Broxburn, East Lothian, Scotland
 Broxburn, Queensland, Australia
 Broxburn Athletic F.C., in the town of Broxburn, West Lothian, Scotland
 Broxburn United F.C., in the town of Broxburn, West Lothian, Scotland

See also Broxbourne:
 Broxbourne, a town in Hertfordshire, England